Rajesh Panditrao Ekade is a leader of Indian National Congress and a member of the Maharashtra Legislative Assembly elected from Malkapur Assembly constituency in Buldhana city.

Positions held
 2019: Elected to Maharashtra Legislative Assembly.

References

Living people
Members of the Maharashtra Legislative Assembly
Indian National Congress politicians from Maharashtra
People from Buldhana
Year of birth missing (living people)